The men's 4x400 metres relay event at the 1998 World Junior Championships in Athletics was held in Annecy, France, at Parc des Sports on 1 and 2 August.

Medalists

Results

Final
2 August

Heats
1 August

Heat 1

Heat 2

Participation
According to an unofficial count, 60 athletes from 14 countries participated in the event.

References

4 x 400 metres relay
Relays at the World Athletics U20 Championships